Parma is a locality in the City of Shoalhaven in New South Wales, Australia. It lies about 16 km to the southwest of Nowra to the west of the Princes Highway. It is largely made up of grazing land or rural residences. It was previously called "Parma Ville".

References

City of Shoalhaven